Ex-Plumber is a 1931 comedy film directed by Fatty Arbuckle.

Cast
 Lloyd Hamilton
 Addie McPhail
 Stanley Blystone
 Mitchell Lewis
 Amber Norman
 Polly Christy

See also
 List of American films of 1931
 Fatty Arbuckle filmography

External links

1931 films
1931 comedy films
1931 short films
American black-and-white films
Films directed by Roscoe Arbuckle
Educational Pictures short films
Films with screenplays by Roscoe Arbuckle
American comedy short films
1930s English-language films
1930s American films